How Green Was My Valley is a 1941 American drama film set in Wales, directed by John Ford. The film, based on the bestselling 1939 novel of the same name by Richard Llewellyn, was produced by Darryl F. Zanuck and scripted by Philip Dunne. It stars Walter Pidgeon, Maureen O'Hara, Anna Lee, Donald Crisp, and a very young Roddy McDowall.

It tells the story of the Morgans, a hard-working Welsh mining family, from the point of view of the youngest child Huw, who lives with his affectionate and kind parents as well as his sister and five brothers, in the South Wales Valleys during the late Victorian era. The story chronicles life in the South Wales coalfields, the loss of that way of life and its effects on the family. The fictional village in the film is based on Gilfach Goch, where Llewellyn spent many summers visiting his grandfather, and it served as the inspiration for the novel. The author had claimed that he based the book on his own personal experiences but this was found to be untrue after his death; Llewellyn was English-born and spent little time in Wales, though he was of Welsh descent. Llewellyn gathered material for the novel from conversations with local mining families in Gilfach Goch.

It was nominated for ten Academy Awards, winning five, famously beating Citizen Kane, Sergeant York and The Maltese Falcon for Best Picture, while Ford won for Best Director, Donald Crisp for Best Supporting Actor, Arthur Miller for Best Cinematography, and Richard Day, Nathan H. Juran and Thomas Little for Best Black-and-White Art Direction-Interior Decoration. In 1990, the film was selected for preservation in the United States National Film Registry of the Library of Congress as being "culturally, historically, or aesthetically significant". The Academy Film Archive preserved How Green Was My Valley in 1998.

Plot

The film begins with a monolog by an older Huw Morgan (voiced by Irving Pichel): "I am packing my belongings in the shawl my mother used to wear when she went to the market. And I'm going from my valley. And this time, I shall never return." The valley and its villages are now blackened by the dust of the coal mines that surround the area.

A young Huw (Roddy McDowall), the youngest child of Gwilym Morgan (Donald Crisp), walks home with his father to meet his mother, Beth (Sara Allgood). His older brothers, Ianto (John Loder), Ivor (Patric Knowles), Davy (Richard Fraser), Gwilym Jr. (Evan S. Evans), and Owen (James Monks) all work in the coal mines with their father, while sister Angharad (Maureen O'Hara) keeps house with their mother. Huw's childhood is idyllic; the town, not yet overrun with mining spoil, is beautiful, the household is warm and loving, and the miners sing as they walk home (in this case "Cwm Rhondda"). The wages are collected, the men wash then eat together. Afterwards the spending money is given out. Huw is smitten on meeting Bronwyn (Anna Lee), a girl engaged to be married to his eldest brother, Ivor (Patric Knowles). At the boisterous wedding party Angharad meets the new preacher, Mr. Gruffydd (Walter Pidgeon), and there is an obvious mutual attraction.

Trouble begins when the mine owner decreases wages, and the miners strike in protest. Gwilym's attempt to mediate by not endorsing a strike estranges him from the other miners as well as his older sons, who quit the house. Beth interrupts a late night meeting of the strikers, threatening to kill anyone who harms her husband. She and Huw head across the fields in a snowstorm in the dark to return home. Later on their way home the strikers hear Huw calling for help. They rescue Beth and Huw from the river. Beth has temporarily lost the use of her legs and the doctor fears that Huw, who has also lost the use of his legs, will never walk again. He eventually recovers with the help of Mr. Gruffydd, which further endears the latter to Angharad.

The strike is eventually settled, and Gwilym and his sons reconcile, yet many miners have lost their jobs. The exceptionally beautiful Angharad is courted by the mine owner's son, Iestyn Evans (Marten Lamont), though she loves Mr. Gruffydd. Mr. Gruffydd loves her too, to the malicious delight of the gossipy townswomen, but cannot bear to subject her to the hard, spartan life of an impoverished churchman. Angharad submits to a loveless marriage to Evans, and they relocate out of the country.

Huw begins school at a nearby village. Abused by other boys, he is taught to fight by boxer Dai Bando (Rhys Williams) and his crony, Cyfartha (Barry Fitzgerald). After a beating by the cruel teacher Mr. Jonas (Morton Lowry), Dai Bando avenges Huw with an impromptu boxing display on Mr. Jonas to the delight of his pupils.

Bronwyn learns Ivor has been killed in a mine accident. The shock causes her to go into labor and she gives birth to a son. Later, two of Morgan's sons are dismissed in favor of less experienced, cheaper laborers. With no job prospects, they leave to seek their fortunes abroad. Huw is awarded a scholarship to university, but to his father's dismay he refuses it to work in the mines. He relocates with Bronwyn, to help provide for her and her child.

When Angharad returns without her husband, vicious gossip of an impending divorce spreads through the town. It is eventually announced there will be a meeting of the Deacons - the governing council of the local Calvinistic Methodist chapel - to discuss, denounce and excommunicate Angharad. This prospect enrages Mr. Gryffudd, for he knows she has done nothing other than return home from Cape Town without her husband. After condemning the Deacon's small-mindedness, he storms out before the meeting intent on leaving the town.

But that evening, the alarm whistle sounds, signaling another mine disaster. Several men are injured, and Gwilym and others are trapped in a cave-in. Mr Gryffudd catches sight of Angharad, who has rushed to the mine for word of her father; and we know from his expression that he will never leave now. As she looks pleadingly at him, he calls, "Who is for Gwilym Morgan and the others?"

Young Huw, Mr. Gruffydd, and Dai Bando then descend with other volunteers to rescue the remaining miners. Gwilym and his son are briefly re-united before he succumbs to his injuries.

Above, in the cold of light dawn, the women of the family - Angharad, Bronwyn and Beth Morgan - have stood vigil all night; when Beth says, just after Gwilym's death, "He came just now. Ivor was with him. He told me of the glories he had seen!" Then the sound of the pulley announces the lift is returning from the depths of the mine.  Huw is cradling his father's body, his coal-blackened face devoid of youthful innocence.

Narration by an older Huw recalls, "Men like my father cannot die. They are with me still, real in memory as they were in flesh, loving and beloved forever. How green was my valley then."  The movie ends with a montage of family vignettes showing Huw with his father and mother, his brothers and sister.

Cast

Walter Pidgeon as Mr. Gruffydd, pastor of the village chapel
Maureen O'Hara as Angharad Morgan
Donald Crisp as Gwilym Morgan
Roddy McDowall as Huw Morgan
Sara Allgood as Mrs. Beth Morgan
Anna Lee as Bronwen, Ivor's wife
Patric Knowles as Ivor Morgan
John Loder as Ianto Morgan
Barry Fitzgerald as Cyfartha, boxing manager
Rhys Williams as Dai Bando, boxer
Morton Lowry as Mr. Jonas, school teacher

Arthur Shields as Mr. Parry, deacon
Frederick Worlock as Dr. Richards
Richard Fraser as Davy Morgan
Evan S. Evans as Gwilym Morgan Jr.
James Monks as Owen Morgan
Ethel Griffies as Mrs. Nicholas, housekeeper
Lionel Pape as Mr. Evans senior
Marten Lamont as Iestyn Evans, his son
Ann E. Todd as Ceinwen, school girl
Clifford Severn as Mervyn Phillips, school bully
Irving Pichel as adult Huw Morgan (the unseen narrator)

Production
The script was written by Philip Dunne. He later recalled reading the original novel "in horror, turgid stuff, long speeches about Welsh coal miners on strike."

William Wyler, the original director, saw the screen test of McDowall and chose him for the part. Wyler was replaced by John Ford. Fox wanted to shoot the movie in Wales in Technicolor, but it was impossible to do so during World War II. Instead, Ford had the studio build an 80-acre authentic replica of a Welsh mining town at Brent's Crags (subsequently Crags Country Club) in the Santa Monica Mountains near Malibu, California.

Reception
On Rotten Tomatoes, How Green Was My Valley held, an approval rating of 93% based on 84 reviews, with an average rating of 7.9/10. The site's critics consensus reads: "Though it perhaps strays into overly maudlin territory, this working-class drama is saved by a solid cast and director John Ford's unmistakable style." Tim Dirks of Filmsite.org lauded the film as "one of John Ford's masterpieces of sentimental human drama."

While the opinion among the Academy Awards committee that it was 1941's Best Picture has been disputed by some later critics, How Green Was My Valley continues to be well received in its own right and, in 1990, was added to the American National Film Registry. Academy Award-winning actor and director Clint Eastwood named it as one of his favorite movies.

Accolades

American Film Institute Lists
AFI's 100 Years...100 Movies - Nominated
AFI's 100 Years...100 Movie Quotes:
"Men like my father cannot die.  They are with me still -- real in memory as they were in flesh, loving and beloved forever. How green was my valley then." - Nominated
AFI's 100 Years of Film Scores - Nominated
AFI's 100 Years...100 Movies (10th Anniversary Edition) - Nominated

Adaptations
How Green Was My Valley was adapted as a half-hour radio play on the March 22, 1942, broadcast of The Screen Guild Theater, with Sara Allgood, Donald Crisp, Roddy McDowall, Maureen O'Hara and Walter Pidgeon.

It was also adapted for three one-hour broadcasts of the Lux Radio Theatre: on September 21, 1942, with Allgood, Crisp, O'Hara, McDowall and Pidgeon; on March 31, 1947, with Crisp and David Niven; and on September 28, 1954, with Crisp and Donna Reed.

See also
How Green Was My Valley (novel)
The Proud Valley
The Stars Look Down
1926 United Kingdom general strike
English-language accents in film – Welsh

References

Footnotes

Citations

External links

How Green Was My Valley at Reel Classics
How Green Was My Valley at Film Site web site; contains plot detail.

American drama films
Best Picture Academy Award winners
American black-and-white films
Films about the labor movement
Films based on British novels
Films directed by John Ford
Films featuring a Best Supporting Actor Academy Award-winning performance
Films set in Wales
Films whose art director won the Best Art Direction Academy Award
Films whose cinematographer won the Best Cinematography Academy Award
Films whose director won the Best Directing Academy Award
Labour disputes in the United Kingdom
Films about mining
Films set in mining communities
Mining in the United Kingdom
1941 drama films
1941 films
20th Century Fox films
United States National Film Registry films
Silver Condor Award for Best Foreign Film winners
Films scored by Alfred Newman
Films with screenplays by Philip Dunne
Films produced by Darryl F. Zanuck
1940s English-language films
1940s American films